Siamspinops is a genus of Asian wall spiders that was first described by P. Dankittipakul & J. A. Corronca in 2009. It was merged with the monotypic genus Pakawops in 2019.

Species
 it contains Seven species, found in Asia:
Siamspinops aculeatus (Simon, 1901) – Malaysia
Siamspinops allospinosus Dankittipakul & Corronca, 2009 – Thailand
Siamspinops garoensis (Kadam,Tripathi & Sankaran, 2022) – India
Siamspinops formosensis (Kayashima, 1943) – Taiwan
Siamspinops spinescens Dankittipakul & Corronca, 2009 – Malaysia
Siamspinops spinosissimus Dankittipakul & Corronca, 2009 (type) – Thailand
Siamspinops spinosus Dankittipakul & Corronca, 2009 – Thailand

See also
 List of Selenopidae species

References

Araneomorphae genera
Selenopidae
Spiders of Asia